Alexander Higgins MM (4 November 1885 – 15 March 1939) was a Scottish footballer who played as a forward for Newcastle United, Kilmarnock, Nottingham Forest, Jarrow, Norwich City and the Scotland national team.

Career
Higgins was described as a player who could go by players with ease, but sometimes would be selfish with the ball and would try to do more than passing a simple ball. He won a Football League Championship and FA Cup with Newcastle United, playing for the club between 1905 and 1919, appearing in 150 games and scoring 41 goals.

He later played for hometown club Kilmarnock, (where he had also been prior to joining Newcastle, without playing a first team game) and was with the club when they won the 1920 Scottish Cup, but did not play in the final because his father (Sandy Higgins Snr, also a footballer who had played for Kilmarnock as well as Derby County and Nottingham Forest) died on the same day – but still was awarded the medal due to the circumstances.

Higgins won four caps for Scotland, all while with Newcastle United.

Personal life 
Higgins served as a corporal in the East Yorkshire Regiment and the Durham Light Infantry during the First World War and won the Military Medal during the course of his service.

Honours
Newcastle United
Football League First Division: 1908–09
 FA Cup: 1909–10

Kilmarnock
 Scottish Cup: 1919–20

References

External links 

1885 births
1939 deaths
Scottish footballers
Newcastle United F.C. players
Kilmarnock F.C. players
Nottingham Forest F.C. players
Norwich City F.C. players
Scotland international footballers
Association football forwards
English Football League players
Footballers from Kilmarnock
Jarrow F.C. players
Workington A.F.C. players
Scottish Football League players
British Army personnel of World War I
East Yorkshire Regiment soldiers
Durham Light Infantry soldiers
Recipients of the Military Medal
FA Cup Final players
Military personnel from East Ayrshire